Karabikha is a village in Yaroslavl Oblast, Russia, located 15 kilometers to the south of Yaroslavl center. The great Russian poet Nikolay Nekrasov lived and worked there for some time.  There is now a Nekrasov museum in the village.

References 

Rural localities in Yaroslavl Oblast
Yaroslavsky District, Yaroslavl Oblast
Biographical museums in Russia
Historic house museums in Russia